Liversedge is a town and Gomersal is a village, and together with the surrounding area they form a ward in the metropolitan borough of Kirklees, West Yorkshire, England.  The ward contains 63 listed buildings that are recorded in the National Heritage List for England.  Of these, five are listed at Grade II*, the middle of the three grades, and the others are at Grade II, the lowest grade.  In addition to Liversedge and Gomersal, the ward contains the settlements of Hartshead, Hightown, and Roberttown and the surrounding countryside.  Most of the listed buildings are houses and associated structures, and farmhouses and farm buildings.  There is a Moravian settlement in Gomersal, and some of its buildings are listed.  The other listed buildings include churches and chapels and items in churchyards, a cross base, a public house, an obelisk, a mounting block and two sets of stocks, boundary stones, a public hall, and two former toll houses.


Key

Buildings

References

Citations

Sources

Lists of listed buildings in West Yorkshire